Barry J. Jozwiak (born December 21, 1945) is a member of the Pennsylvania House of Representatives for the 5th district made up of parts of Berks County. He is a member of the Republican Party.

Personal
Jozwiak earned his associate degree in community services from Penn State University and his B.S. in law enforcement and corrections from Penn State University. His professional experience includes working as a Pennsylvania State Police trooper for 25 years and as Berks County sheriff for 12 years. Jozwiak attained the rank of third class petty officer before his honorable discharge from the US Navy. He served in the US Navy from December 1963 to December 1966.

Political
Jozwiak served as a Bern Township Supervisor.

Committee assignments 

 Commerce
 Game & Fisheries, Vice Chair
 Judiciary, Subcommittee on Crime and Corrections - Chair
 Liquor Control, Subcommittee on Licensing - Chair

References

External links
PA House profile

Living people
Republican Party members of the Pennsylvania House of Representatives
1945 births
Pennsylvania sheriffs
Pennsylvania State University alumni
21st-century American politicians